General Charles Day Palmer, Jr. (February 20, 1902 – June 7, 1999) was a senior United States Army officer who served as Deputy Commander in Chief, United States European Command from 1959 to 1962. His brother, Williston B. Palmer, was also a four-star general, and his grandfather, William E. Birkhimer, was a general and Medal of Honor recipient.

Early life
Palmer was born in Chicago, Illinois on February 20, 1902. After graduating from Washington High School in Washington, D.C., he entered the United States Military Academy, graduating in 1924.

Military career

As the United States entered World War II in December 1941, Palmer, then a major, was in the British West Indies working to establish military bases and on anti-submarine warfare projects. Palmer went to Europe in 1944 as chief of staff of the 2nd Armored Division, then commanded by Major General Edward H. Brooks, and continued in that role during the Normandy invasion, the breakout from Saint-Lô, and crossing the Siegfried Line.

During Operation Dragoon, the Allied invasion of southern France in August 1944, he was chief of staff of the VI Corps, and during this time he received a battlefield promotion to brigadier general.

Palmer was with the 1st Cavalry Division in Japan on occupation duty when the Korean War erupted. He was the commander of the division artillery and later the division commander, participating in six campaigns.

Palmer's later posts included Commander, Sixth United States Army in California and Deputy Commander of United States forces in Europe. After serving as Deputy Commander in Chief, United States European Command, he retired in 1962.

Awards and decorations

Post military career

After retiring from the army, Palmer settled in Washington and worked as a military consultant with the Research Analysis Corporation. He was also a director of both St. Albans School and the Retired Officers Association, and a member of the Army and Navy Club.

Palmer died in Washington D.C. on June 7, 1999 at the age of 97 of cardiac arrest in his home in Knollwood, a military retirement community. He was survived by Eugenia Kingman Palmer, whom he married in 1954, and a son. He was buried in Arlington National Cemetery, next to his brother and wife Eugenia K.

References

External links
Generals of World War II
United States Army Officers 1939–1945

|-

1902 births
1999 deaths
United States Army Field Artillery Branch personnel
United States Army generals
United States Army personnel of the Korean War
United States Military Academy alumni
Recipients of the Distinguished Service Medal (US Army)
Recipients of the Silver Star
Recipients of the Legion of Merit
Recipients of the Distinguished Flying Cross (United States)
Recipients of the Air Medal
Burials at Arlington National Cemetery
Military personnel from Chicago
United States Army generals of World War II